The 1942 Chicago White Sox season was the White Sox's 43rd season. They finished with a record of 66–82, good enough for 6th place in the American League, 34 games behind the 1st place New York Yankees.

Offseason 
 December 9, 1941: Mike Kreevich and Jack Hallett were traded by the White Sox to the Philadelphia Athletics for Wally Moses.

Regular season

Season standings

Record vs. opponents

Opening Day lineup 
 Don Kolloway, 2B
 Wally Moses, CF
 Joe Kuhel, 1B
 Luke Appling, SS
 Bud Sketchley, RF
 Myril Hoag, LF
 Bob Kennedy, 3B
 Mike Tresh, C
 Johnny Rigney, P

Roster

Player stats

Batting 
Note: G = Games played; AB = At bats; R = Runs scored; H = Hits; 2B = Doubles; 3B = Triples; HR = Home runs; RBI = Runs batted in; BB = Base on balls; SO = Strikeouts; AVG = Batting average; SB = Stolen bases

Pitching 
Note: W = Wins; L = Losses; ERA = Earned run average; G = Games pitched; GS = Games started; SV = Saves; IP = Innings pitched; H = Hits allowed; R = Runs allowed; ER = Earned runs allowed; HR = Home runs allowed; BB = Walks allowed; K = Strikeouts

Farm system

References

External links 
 1942 Chicago White Sox at Baseball Reference

Chicago White Sox seasons
Chicago White Sox season
Chicago White